Frank John Giannetti (born March 14, 1968) was an American football defensive tackle in the National Football League (NFL) who played for the Indianapolis Colts. He played college football at Penn State University.

Born in Toms River, New Jersey, Giannetti attended Toms River High School East.

References 

1968 births
Living people
People from Toms River, New Jersey
Sportspeople from Ocean County, New Jersey
Toms River High School East alumni
Players of American football from New Jersey
American football defensive tackles
Penn State Nittany Lions football players
Indianapolis Colts players
Atlanta Falcons players